A list films produced in Pakistan in 1989 (see 1989 in film) and in the Urdu language:

1989

See also
1989 in Pakistan

External links
 Search Pakistani film - IMDB.com

1989
Pakistani
Films